Don't Feed the Pop Monster is the third studio album by New Zealand duo Broods, released on 1 February 2019. Four singles, "Peach", "Everything Goes (Wow)", "Hospitalized", and "Falling Apart" were released prior to the album. The duo also began playing shows from November 2018 in support of the album.

Background
After the release of their 2016 album Conscious, both Georgia and Caleb Nott took time off to pursue solo projects before reuniting in 2018, signing a new record deal with Neon Gold Records and releasing the lead single "Peach". Georgia Nott claimed that second single "Everything Goes (Wow)" was recorded in a tree house in Nicaragua: "We were there as part of a writing camp and it was one of the best experiences of our careers. It's about accepting the mortality of everything and finding peace in that." Georgia also stated for the album, the duo's aim was "to make songs that are true to us and without hiding behind any kind of façade".

Singles
"Peach" was released as the lead single from the album on 9 August 2018, and reached number one on the NZ Hot Singles Chart, a component of the main singles chart that measures the "fastest-moving tracks by sales, streams and airplay". Second single "Everything Goes (Wow)" was released on 16 November 2018, and was called an "airy and fun" pop song and a "strong sign of things to come" by Uproxx. It also appeared on the NZ Hot Singles Chart at number 18. "Hospitalized" was released on 11 January 2019 as the album's third single.

"Peach" was used extensively by Australian television network 10 Peach in their on-air advertisements following the channel's rebranding in 2018.

Track listing

Personnel
Credits adapted from Tidal.

 Chris Gehringer – masterer
 Mark Rankin – mixer , engineer 
 Eric J Dubrovsky – mixer 
 Thommy Schleiter – engineer 
 Alex Wildwood – engineer 
 Leroy Clampitt – engineer 
 Joel Little – engineer 
 Chloe Angelides – vocals

Charts

References

2019 albums
Broods albums
Universal Music Australia albums
Albums produced by Joel Little